In the 2001 season, Kuala Lumpur competed in the Premier 1, Malaysia Cup and Malaysia FA Cup. They finished tenth in the league, but were eliminated in the FA Cup by a second division team and lost all their group matches in the Malaysia Cup. Foreign players were barred for this season.



Results and fixtures
All results (home and away) list Kuala Lumpur's goal tally first.

Tables

Malaysian Premier 1

Scorers

2001